Isakhel Tehsil , is an administrative subdivision (tehsil) of Mianwali District in the Punjab province of Pakistan. The city of Isakhel is the headquarters of the tehsil which is administratively subdivided into 3 Municipal Committees 13 Union Councils.

Administration
The tehsil of Isakhel is administratively subdivided into 3 Municipal Committees 
 MC Isakhel
 MC Kamar Mushani
 MC Kala Bagh 
and 13 Union Councils, these are:

  Chapri
  Khaglan Wala
  Kaloaan Wala
  Kallur Shareef
  Kamar Mushani Pakka
  Kot Chandna
  Manda Khel
  Sultan Khel
  Tabisar
  Tanikhel
  Tola Bhangi Khel
  Trag
  Vanjari

History
During British rule Isakhel became part of Mianwali District when the North-West Frontier Province was created in 1901.

According to the 1901 census, it contained the municipalities of Isa Khel (population, 7,630), the headquarters, and Kalabagh (5,824); and 43 villages. The land revenue and cesses in 1903-4 amounted to 1.6 lakhs. Lying on the west bank of the Indus, this tehsil is cut off from the rest of the District, and would seem to belong more properly to the North-West Frontier Province, but is separated even more completely from Bannu by the semicircular fringe of the Chichali and Maidani hills, which leave it open only
on the river side. These hills drain into Isa Khel and make it fertile. Its extreme northern portion, known as the Bhangi Khel country, is a wild and rugged region, a continuation of the Khattak hills.

The tehsil derives its name from the Isa Khel tribe, sub-tribe of the Niazi Afghans, who, settling here during the sixteenth century, long maintained their independence of the Mughal empire, and at last succumbed to the Nawab of Dera Ismail Khan.

Demography
The main first languages are Punjabi (%), Pashto (%) and Saraiki (%).

References

External links
 Early history of Niazi tribe
 Niazi Chiefs in the Mughal empire

Mianwali District
Tehsils of Punjab, Pakistan